Antônio Augusto Ribeiro Reis Júnior (born 30 January 1975), commonly known as Juninho Pernambucano or simply Juninho, is a Brazilian former professional footballer who was most recently the sporting director of French club Olympique Lyonnais. A dead-ball specialist noted for his bending free kicks, in particular the knuckleball technique which he developed, Juninho holds the record for the highest number of goals scored through free kicks and he is considered by many to be the greatest free kick-taker of all time.

Juninho began his professional career in 1993 with Brazilian club Sport do Recife. Two years later he joined Vasco da Gama where he played over 100 matches and won six titles. In 2001, he joined Ligue 1 side Olympique Lyonnais where he played for the next eight years, winning seven consecutive league titles and scoring 100 goals in 343 official appearances for the club. Following his departure from Lyon in 2009, Juninho played in Qatar with Al-Gharafa and in the United States with New York Red Bulls. The latter stint was wedged between two spells back at Vasco, where he ultimately retired in 2013.

Having made his international debut in 1999, Juninho played 40 games for the Brazil national team and scored six goals. He represented Brazil at the 2001 Copa América and was part of the squad which won the 2005 FIFA Confederations Cup before retiring from international football after the 2006 World Cup. From 2013 to 2018, Juninho was a football commentator for Brazilian sports network Rede Globo.

Club career

Sport Recife
Born in Recife, Juninho started his professional career at Sport Recife and quickly established himself as a rising star in Brazilian football. He won two regional titles with the club. According to Juninho, it was as a 13-year-old that he started to take free-kicks and began to develop his knuckleball technique, telling FourFourTwo magazine: “I started by copying free-kicks taken by Marcelinho, who played for Corinthians. He was one of my inspirations, and the first player I had ever seen hit the ball head on and make it dance in the air. Didi, who won the World Cup with Brazil in 1958 and 1962, was doing it back then, too. Everyone since has just been tweaking the formula.” It was when he got to France that Juninho says he mastered it.

Vasco da Gama
Juninho Pernambucano joined Vasco da Gama in 1995. He won several trophies during his first stint with the club, including the Brazilian Championship in 1997 and 2000, the Copa Libertadores in 1998, the Copa Mercosur in 2000, as well as the 2000 Brazilian Silver Ball award as one of the best Brazilian midfielders of the season. At that time, he was playing with Romário, Edmundo, and Juninho Paulista, and he became a favourite of the Vasco fans. Since that time he has been known as Reizinho de São Januário (The Little King of São Januário), a reference to Vasco da Gama's stadium, as well as Reizinho da Colina (The Little King of the Hill).

In 2001, the player won a preliminary injunction against Vasco da Gama, after which he became a free agent. Although he left Vasco for Lyon after a judicial fight, he is still considered a favourite of Vasco fans. Juninho has been cited in a classic chorus sung by the fans remembering his free-kick goal against River Plate at River Plate Stadium, during the 1998 Libertadores which helped the club reach the finals against Barcelona de Guayaquil, which they won. Juninho played 295 games for Vasco from 1995 to 2001.

Olympique Lyonnais

In 2001, Juninho moved abroad to play for French club Olympique Lyonnais. Before his arrival at Lyon, the club had never won the French championship. Starting out in his first season at the club, Olympique Lyonnais won seven league titles in a row; along with his former Lyon teammates Grégory Coupet and Sidney Govou, he holds the record for most Ligue 1 titles won (seven), along with Hervé Revelli and Jean-Michel Larqué of Saint-Étienne, as well as Thiago Silva and Marco Verratti of Paris Saint–Germain. At Lyon, Juninho made himself especially noted for his accurate, powerful and varied set pieces. As well as often being ranked the world's greatest free kick exponent, Juninho was a noted passer, providing many assists, and his leadership abilities prompted Lyon manager Gérard Houllier to name him team captain.

Juninho Pernambucano scored 100 goals while at Lyon. Forty-four of those goals were scored from free-kicks, the last of which was a strike from long distance against Olympique de Marseille. He scored his 100th goal on his last game for Lyon, through a penalty kick against Caen. Juninho was also a prolific goalscorer in the Champions League, and he matched Sonny Anderson as the club's top goalscorer in European competitions with 16 goals, on a match against Steaua Bucharest in November 2008. He later became Lyon's top goalscorer in the Champions League with 18 goals, while reaching three quarter-finals in the competition.

On 26 May 2009, Lyon chairman Jean-Michel Aulas announced in a press conference that the club had accepted Juninho's request to leave Lyon at the end of the season as a free agent, despite the fact that the player still had a year left in his contract. During the press conference, Juninho sat next to Aulas and left without saying a word.

Al-Gharafa
On 17 June 2009, Juninho signed a €2.5 million, two-year contract with Qatari club Al-Gharafa. In his first season with the club, Juninho captained the team to their seventh league title and wins in the Qatari Stars Cup and Qatar Crown Prince Cup, completing the treble. He finished the season with Player of the Year honours from the Qatar Football Association. Juninho played 66 games for Al-Gharafa and scored 25 goals.

Return to Vasco da Gama
On 27 April 2011, Juninho rejoined his former club Vasco da Gama. He scored his first goal for them in his first game back, via a freekick against Corinthians. He scored another 2 free kicks and a penalty during the course of the Brazilian top flight season. On 28 March 2012, he played and scored a goal for a 4–1 lead in Edmundo's farewell game against Barcelona Sporting Club. Vasco went on to win this game 9–1. Juninho then scored a trademark free kick against Esporte Clube Bahia in the fourth round of the Campeonato Brasileiro; that goal was to be his 16th since returning to Vasco from Al-Gharafa.

In July 2012, Juninho extended his contract with Vasco for 6 months. On 18 July 2012, he made his 350th appearance for the club against São Paulo FC. In August 2012 he played against his youth team Sport Club do Recife and scored a free kick goal, which was his fourth goal from free kicks in Campeonato Brasileiro Série A 2012.

New York Red Bulls
On 17 December 2012, Juninho signed for Major League Soccer team New York Red Bulls. He made his first appearance for the team on a friendly match against Malmö, in which he was a starter. On 3 March 2013, Juninho made his official debut for the Red Bulls, playing the full time in a 3–3 draw against the Portland Timbers. On 3 July, the club announced that they reached an agreement with Juninho for the cancelation of his contract. The midfielder featured in 13 games for the New York Red Bulls, providing the team with four assists.

Third stint with Vasco da Gama and retirement

On 11 July 2013, Vasco da Gama announced Juninho's return to the club. The player scored and assisted in his third debut for Vasco, in a 3–1 victory against rivals Fluminense. He scored his first home goal of the season against Criciúma with a 32-metre free kick, also assisting Edmílson for the third goal of the game. He played his third game for Vasco da Gama against another rival team Botafogo, setting up Andre for Vasco's first goal, in a 3–2 defeat. He played his sixth game against Grêmio and made another assist. It was his fourth assist in Campeonato Brasileiro. Juninho made his fifth assist against Sport Club Corinthians Paulista; the game ended in a 1–1 draw. He played his 16th game against Vasco rivals Botafogo and made two assists; the game ended with a 2–2 draw after Botafogo had led 2–0. Juninho played 16 games for Vasco in his third stint with the club, scoring 2 goals and making 7 assists in the Campeonato Brasileiro.

He retired from playing professional football on 2 February 2014. During his years at Vasco da Gama, Juninho won six titles: the Brazilian Championship in 1997 and 2000, the Campeonato Carioca in 1998, the Rio-São Paulo Tournament in 1999, the Copa Libertadores in 1998, and the Copa Mercosur in 2000. He played in 393 games in total for the club, scoring 76 goals.

Following his retirement, Juninho worked as a football commentator for Brazilian sports network Rede Globo, a stint that ended up in 2018.

International career
On 7 September 1999, Juninho Pernambucano played two top-level matches in two different countries in the same day. He represented his country in the second half of the friendly match between Brazil and Argentina in Porto Alegre, which Brazil won 4–2, playing about fifteen minutes. In spite of a delayed flight to Montevideo, he managed to arrive in Uruguay in time to feature in the second half of the Copa Mercosur match between Vasco and Nacional. He took part at the 2001 Copa América with Brazil.

Although Juninho had a period of prolonged domestic success during the 2000s, that contributed to him being considered one of the best Brazilian players in the world at the time, he was not selected for the Brazilian squad that featured in the 2002 FIFA World Cup and in the 2004 Copa América missing both because of a recurring knee injury. Brazil would win both tournaments. He was however a member of the Brazil squad that won the 2005 FIFA Confederations Cup.

In the 2006 FIFA World Cup Juninho scored against Japan in a group stage match. Following Brazil's defeat to eventual runners-up France in the quarter-finals of the tournament, he announced his international retirement, so as to make way for younger talents coming through the ranks in Brazil, in order to build for the 2010 FIFA World Cup.

Director career
In May 2019, Juninho was appointed as the director of football of his former club Olympique Lyonnais. His first decision was to name former Brazilian international teammate Sylvinho as the head coach of the French Ligue 1 team.

Style of play

Juninho has been described as "one of the world's most feared strikers of a static ball". Frequently ranked the greatest free-kick exponent, the method he used for long-range free kicks is "knuckle balling", where the ball has almost no spinning motion during flight. A successful knuckle ball will "move" or "wobble" in the air unpredictably, veering in a number of different directions (making it difficult to save) before finding the net. He first made his name as a free kick taker with a long range strike against Bayern Munich in the 2003–04 Champions League group stage in which the ball dipped viciously at the end of travel that deceived Bayern keeper Oliver Kahn, who was considered one of the best goalkeepers in the world at the time.

Juninho has scored from free-kicks beyond 40 yards on a number of occasions: including against AC Ajaccio in 2006, against Barcelona in 2007, against OGC Nice in 2008, and a strike against Marseille in 2009—his final free kick goal for Lyon. Even before Lyon, he displayed his talent at Vasco da Gama, scoring several free kick goals for the club. Juninho has also scored memorable free kick goals for Brazil, the most famous being a curling shot from 30 yards against Greece in the 2005 FIFA Confederations Cup. Brazil would go on to win the match 3–0. Also, Juninho scored two free kicks against Nice in the 2008–09 season as Lyon were losing 2–0, with his second from 48 yards out. Juninho's free-kick style has been adapted by several other players, such as Andrea Pirlo, Cristiano Ronaldo, Didier Drogba, and Gareth Bale. The knuckle ball free-kick technique takes a significant amount of skill to replicate and strike accurately. In total, Juninho scored at least 75 goals from direct free kicks throughout his professional football career, which spanned from 1993 to 2013.

A talented right-footed midfielder, beyond his qualities as a set-piece specialist, Juninho was also known for his skill as an offensive playmaker, and for his ability to produce effective passes, which led him to getting assists on many of his teammates' goals throughout his career. He was also gifted with good technical ability and intelligence, as well as excellent vision and passing range, and powerful and accurate striking ability from distance; furthermore, he drew praise in the media for his tenacity, work-rate, composure under pressure, strong character, and leadership, which saw him serve as club captain both at Lyon and Al-Gharafa. A versatile player, although he usually played as an attacking midfielder, he was also capable of playing as a winger or as a central midfielder.

Personal life
Juninho is one of the few footballers to publicly speak out against racism in the country, as well as criticize Jair Bolsonaro, the far-right former president of Brazil that assumed office on 1 January 2019. He is a father and a grandfather.

Career statistics

Club

International

Scores and results list Brazil's goal tally first, score column indicates score after each Juninho goal.

Honours
Sport Recife
Campeonato Pernambucano: 1994
Copa do Nordeste: 1994

Vasco da Gama
Campeonato Brasileiro Série A: 1997, 2000
Campeonato Carioca: 1998
Torneio Rio-São Paulo: 1999
Copa Libertadores: 1998
Copa Mercosur: 2000

Lyon
Ligue 1 (7): 2001–02, 2002–03, 2003–04, 2004–05, 2005–06, 2006–07, 2007–08
Coupe de France: 2007–08
Trophée Des Champions (6) 2002, 2003, 2004, 2005, 2006, 2007

Al-Gharafa
Qatar Stars League: 2009–10
Qatari Stars Cup: 2009
Qatar Crown Prince Cup: 2010, 2011

Brazil
FIFA Confederations Cup: 2005
Toulon Tournament: 1995
Lunar New Year Cup: 2005

Individual
Revista Placar Bola de Prata: 2000
UNFP Ligue 1 Player of the Month: February 2005, March 2005, October 2006
UNFP Ligue 1 Player of the Year: 2005–06
UNFP Ligue 1 Team of the Year: 2003–04, 2004–05, 2005–06
ESM Team of the Year: 2005–06, 2006–07
Qatar Football Association Player of the Year: 2010

References
Notes

Citations

External links

 
 
 Juninho Pernambucano at CR Vasco da Gama
 

1975 births
Living people
Brazilian people of Portuguese descent
Sportspeople from Recife
Brazilian footballers
Association football midfielders
Sport Club do Recife players
CR Vasco da Gama players
Olympique Lyonnais players
Al-Gharafa SC players
New York Red Bulls players
Campeonato Brasileiro Série A players
Ligue 1 players
Qatar Stars League players
Major League Soccer players
Brazil international footballers
2001 Copa América players
2005 FIFA Confederations Cup players
2006 FIFA World Cup players
Copa Libertadores-winning players
FIFA Confederations Cup-winning players
Brazilian expatriate footballers
Brazilian expatriate sportspeople in France
Brazilian expatriate sportspeople in Qatar
Brazilian expatriate sportspeople in the United States
Expatriate footballers in France
Expatriate footballers in Qatar
Expatriate soccer players in the United States